Ellychnia is a genus of fireflies.  First defined by Émile Blanchard in 1845, the genus contains 24 species, which are widespread in the United States. Adults are black, with rose-colored marks on the pronotum; sexual dimorphism is unknown. These beetles are active during the day, and have no light-producing organs as adults; instead, they attract mates using chemical signals. The larvae of Ellychnia fireflies live in rotting logs.

Species list
E. affinis
E. albilatera
E. atra
E. aurora
E. autumnalis
E. bivulneris
E. californica
E. cordovae
E. corrusca
E. facula
E. flavicollis
E. fumigata
E. granulicollis
E. greeni
E. hatchi
E. lacustris
E. lunicollis
E. mexicana
E. moesta
E. obscurevittata
E. salvini
E. sanguinicollis
E. simplex
E. variegata

References

Cited texts
 

Lampyridae genera
Lampyridae
Beetles of North America
Taxa named by Émile Blanchard